Canny Leung Chi-Shan is a Hong Kong songwriter and author.

Biography 
Leung is a graduate of the Hong Kong Polytechnic University.

Career
Leung was a model, an actor in television commercials, and an emcee on television and radio programs. She also performed at The Justice of Life a Hong Kong classic television drama, starring alongside Stephen Chow Sing-chi and Anthony Wong Chau-sang. She is a songwriter, providing lyrics for musicians such as Andy Hui, Sammi Cheng, and Kelly Chen.  She has published literary works in newspapers and magazines, including Apple Daily, Oriental Daily, The Sun, Ming Pao, Hong Kong Economic Times, Hong Kong Economic Journal, Cosmopolitan and Elle. Certain of her fiction works have been adapted into film, television, and radio dramas.

Community engagement
Leung founded the Hong Kong Pegasus, formerly named Tin Shui Wai Pegasus Football Club in 2008, for community building and improving the new town's reputation at Tin Shui Wai. At its initial season, Pegasus won the champions at the Hong Kong Senior Shield. The organization has been supported by brands such as Sony PlayStation. She became chairman in 2015. Former players include Lee Ka Yiu, Tan Chun Lok, Lo Kong Wai, Leung Kwun Chung, and Leung Nok Hang of the Hong Kong national football team.

Personal life 
Leung's husband was Steven Lo, They divorced in 2018.

See also 
 Military Attack (race horse)

References

External links 
 Canny Leung at imdb.com

1968 births
Living people
20th-century Hong Kong actresses
Alumni of the Hong Kong Polytechnic University
Hong Kong chief executives
Hong Kong female models
Hong Kong investors
Hong Kong lyricists
Hong Kong novelists
Hong Kong philanthropists
Hong Kong songwriters
Hong Kong women in business